Since becoming a foundation club of the Victorian Football League (VFL)—which is now known as the Australian Football League (AFL)—in 1897, there have been 31 senior coaches of the Geelong Football Club. To qualify, a coach must have coached the club in at least one senior VFL/AFL match, defined as an Australian rules football match between two clubs that are, or were at the time of the match, members of the VFL/AFL. A senior VFL/AFL match is played under the laws of Australian football, and includes regular season matches, as well as finals series matches. It does not include pre-season competition matches, Night Series matches, interstate matches or international rules football matches. The list is arranged in the order in which each coach first coached a game for Geelong in a senior VFL/AFL match.

Key

Coaches 
Figures correct as of end of 2022 season.

AFL Women's Coaches 
Figures correct as of end of 2021 season.

References 
General

 
 

Specific

Lists of Australian Football League coaches by club
Geelong-related lists